Vesyoloye is a rural locality (a selo) in Arginsky Selsoviet of Seryshevsky District, Amur Oblast, Russia. The population was 84 as of 2018. There is 1 street.

Geography 
Vesyoloye is located 33 km north of Seryshevo (the district's administrative centre) by road. Arga is the nearest rural locality.

References 

Rural localities in Seryshevsky District